John Leslie Coogan (October 26, 1914 – March 1, 1984) was an American actor and comedian who began his film career as a child actor in silent films.

Charlie Chaplin's film classic The Kid (1921) made him one of the first child stars in the history of Hollywood. He later sued his mother and stepfather over his squandered film earnings and provoked California to enact the first known legal protection for the earnings of child performers, the California Child Actors Bill, widely known as the Coogan Act. Coogan continued to act throughout his life, later earning renewed fame in middle age portraying Uncle Fester in the 1960s television series The Addams Family.

Early life and early career

Coogan was born John Leslie Coogan in Los Angeles, California in 1914 to John Henry Coogan Jr. and Lillian Rita (Dolliver) Coogan. He began performing as an infant in both vaudeville and film, with an uncredited role in the 1917 film Skinner's Baby. Charlie Chaplin discovered him in the Orpheum Theatre, a vaudeville house in Los Angeles, on the stage doing the shimmy, a then-popular dance. Coogan's father was also an actor, as was his younger brother, Robert.

Coogan was a natural mimic and delighted Chaplin with his abilities. Chaplin cast him in a small role in A Day's Pleasure (1919). The following year, Chaplin cast Coogan as the abandoned child raised by his Tramp character in the silent comedy-drama The Kid (1921). In 1922, Coogan was cast in the title role in Oliver Twist, directed by Frank Lloyd. Coogan was one of the first stars to be heavily merchandised. Peanut butter, stationery, whistles, dolls, records, coins and figurines were among the Coogan-themed merchandise on sale. He was tutored until the age of 10, when he entered Urban Military Academy and other prep schools. He attended several colleges, as well as the University of Southern California. In 1932, he dropped out of Santa Clara University because of poor grades.

In November 1933, 22-year-old Brooke Hart, a close friend of Coogan from Santa Clara University and heir to a successful department store in San Jose, was kidnapped as he drove his car out of a parking lot. After several demands for a $40,000 ransom were delivered to the family, police arrested Thomas Thurmond and Jack Holmes in San Jose. Thurmond admitted that he and Holmes had murdered Hart the same day he was kidnapped. Both killers were transferred to a jail in downtown San Jose. A mob broke into the jail, and Thurmond and Holmes were hanged from a tree in a nearby park, with the unapologetic approval of the state's governor. Coogan was reported to be present and to have held the lynching rope.

In May 1935, 20-year-old Coogan was the sole survivor of a car crash in eastern San Diego County that killed his father; his best friend 19-year-old actor Junior Durkin; their ranch foreman, Charles Jones; and actor and writer Robert J. Horner. The party was returning from a day of dove hunting just over the Mexican border. With his father at the wheel, the car was forced off the mountain highway near Pine Valley by an oncoming vehicle and rolled down an embankment.

Coogan Bill

As a child star, Coogan earned an estimated $3 to $4 million ($44 to $59 million in 2021 dollars). When he turned 21 in October 1935, his fortune was believed to be well intact. His assets had been conservatively managed by his father, who had died in the car accident five months earlier.

However, Coogan soon discovered that nearly the entire amount had been squandered by his mother and stepfather, Arthur Bernstein, on fur coats, diamonds and other jewelry and expensive cars. Bernstein had been a financial advisor for the family and married Coogan's mother in late 1936. Coogan's mother and stepfather claimed Jackie enjoyed himself and simply thought he was playing before the camera. She insisted, "No promises were ever made to give Jackie anything", and claimed he "was a bad boy". Coogan sued them in 1938, but after his legal expenses, he received just $126,000 of the $250,000 remaining of his earnings. When Coogan went broke during the litigation he asked Charlie Chaplin for assistance; Chaplin handed him $1,000 cash without hesitation.

The legal battle focused attention on child actors and resulted in the 1939 enactment of the California Child Actor's Bill, often referred to as the "Coogan Law" or the "Coogan Act". It required that a child actor's employer set aside 15% of the earnings in a trust (called a Coogan account) and specified the actor's schooling, work hours and time off.

Charity work
Coogan worked with Near East Relief, he toured across the United States and Europe in 1924 on a "Children's Crusade" as part of his fundraising drive, which provided more than $1 million in clothing, food and other contributions ($14.8 million in 2021 dollars). He was honored by officials in the United States and Greece, where he had an audience with Pope Pius XI.

A Catholic, Coogan was a member of the Good Shepherd Parish and the Catholic Motion Picture Guild in Beverly Hills.

Later years

Film
Coogan appeared with then-wife Betty Grable in College Swing, a 1938 musical comedy starring George Burns, Gracie Allen, Martha Raye and Bob Hope.

He appeared as a police officer in the Elvis Presley comedy Girl Happy in 1965.

Radio
In 1940, Coogan played the role of "a playboy Broadway producer" in the Society Girl program on CBS radio. He also starred in his own program, Forever Ernest, on CBS from April 29, 1946, to July 22, 1946.

World War II
Coogan enlisted in the U.S. Army in March 1941. After the attack on Pearl Harbor that December, he requested a transfer to Army Air Forces as a glider pilot because of his civilian flying experience. Graduating the Advanced Glider School with the Glider Pilot aeronautical rating and the rank of Flight Officer, he volunteered for hazardous duty with the 1st Air Commando Group.

In December 1943, the unit was sent to India. He flew British troops, the Chindits, under General Orde Wingate on March 5, 1944, landing them at night in a small jungle clearing  behind Japanese lines in the Burma Campaign.

Television

After the war, Coogan returned to acting, taking mostly character roles and appearing on television. From 1952 to 1953, he played Stoney Crockett on the syndicated series Cowboy G-Men. In 1959, he guest-starred in a first-season episode of Peter Gunn. He also appeared on NBC's The Martha Raye Show. He appeared, too, as Corbett, in two episodes of NBC's 1960 series The Outlaws. In the 1960–1961 season, he guest-starred in the episode "The Damaged Dolls" of the crime drama The Brothers Brannagan. In 1961, he guest-starred in an episode of The Americans, an NBC series about family divisions stemming from the Civil War. He also appeared in episode 37, titled "Barney on the Rebound", of The Andy Griffith Show, which aired October 31, 1961. He had a regular role in a 1962–63 NBC series, McKeever and the Colonel. He finally found his most famous television role as Uncle Fester in ABC's The Addams Family (1964–1966).

He appeared four times on the Perry Mason series, including the role of political activist Gus Sawyer in the 1963 episode, "The Case of the Witless Witness" and TV prop man Pete Desmond in the final episode, "The Case of the Final Fadeout", in 1966. He was a guest several times on The Red Skelton Show, appeared twice on The Brady Bunch ("The Fender Benders" and "Double Parked"), I Dream of Jeannie (as Jeannie's uncle, Suleiman – Maharaja of Basenji), Family Affair, Here's Lucy and The Brian Keith Show and continued to guest-star on television, including multiple appearances on The Partridge Family The Wild Wild West, Hawaii Five-O and McMillan and Wife, until his retirement in the middle 1970s. Coogan also appeared in the first season of Barnaby Jones; episode titled, "Sing a Song of Murder" (04/01/1973).

Marriages and children
Coogan was married four times and had four children. His first three marriages to actresses were short-lived.  He and Betty Grable were engaged in 1935 and married on November 20, 1937,
 and they divorced on October 11, 1939. On August 10, 1941, he married Flower Parry (d.1981). They had one son, John Anthony Coogan (writer/producer of 3D digital and film, also known as Jackie Coogan, Jr.), born in Los Angeles; they divorced on June 29, 1943. Coogan married his third wife, Ann McCormack, on December 26, 1946. A daughter, Joann Dolliver Coogan, was born  in Los Angeles. They divorced on September 20, 1951.

Dorothea Odetta Hanson, also known as Dorothea Lamphere (but best known as Dodie), was a dancer and became Coogan's fourth wife in April 1952. They  were together over 30 years until his death in 1984. She died in 1999. They had two children together: daughter Leslie Diane Coogan was born in Los Angeles, while son Christopher Fenton Coogan was born in Riverside County, California. He died in a motorcycle accident in Palm Springs, California.

Leslie Coogan has a son, actor Keith Coogan, who was born Keith Eric Mitchell. He began acting in 1975 and later changed his name two years after his grandfather's death, in 1986. His roles include the oldest son in Adventures in Babysitting and Don't Tell Mom the Babysitter's Dead.

Footage of Jackie with his grandson Keith can be seen in the 1982 documentary Hollywood's Children.

Death

After suffering from heart and kidney ailments, Coogan died of heart failure on March 1, 1984, at age 69, in Santa Monica, California. Coogan had a long history of heart trouble and hypertension and had previously suffered several strokes. He had been undergoing kidney dialysis when his blood pressure dropped. Coogan was taken to Santa Monica Hospital, where he died from cardiac arrest.

At Coogan's request, his funeral was open to the public and was attended by several fans. John Astin, Coogan's co-star from The Addams Family, delivered the eulogy. Coogan was interred at Holy Cross Cemetery in Culver City. His star on the Hollywood Walk of Fame is located at 1654 Vine Street, just south of Hollywood Boulevard.

Filmography

References

Further reading
 Jackie Coogan: The World's Boy King: A Biography of Hollywood's Legendary Child Star, Diana Serra Cary, Scarecrow Press, 2003, .
 Holmstrom, John. The Moving Picture Boy: An International Encyclopaedia from 1895 to 1995, Norwich, Michael Russell, 1996, pp. 65–67.
 Dye, David. Child and Youth Actors: Filmography of Their Entire Careers, 1914-1985. Jefferson, NC: McFarland & Co., 1988, pp. 37–40.

External links

 
 
 Photographs of Jackie Coogan
 Jackie Coogan's Million-Dollar Crusade at the Near East Relief Digital Museum

1914 births
1984 deaths
Male actors from Los Angeles
American male child actors
American male comedians
American male film actors
American male silent film actors
American male radio actors
American male television actors
Burials at Holy Cross Cemetery, Culver City
Male actors from Greater Los Angeles
Military personnel from California
Vaudeville performers
American Roman Catholics
United States Army Air Forces officers
United States Army Air Forces pilots of World War II
American glider pilots
20th-century American male actors
Comedians from California
20th-century American comedians
Hanna-Barbera people